Mount Olympus is a prominent neighborhood in the Hollywood Hills area of the city of Los Angeles, California. It is a community of single family residences founded in 1969 by developer Russ Vincent. It is bounded by Hollywood Boulevard, Laurel Canyon Boulevard, Willow Glen Road, and Nichols Canyon Road. It is home to a small Greek community, hence the name.

In popular culture
The community was featured in the movie Hollywood Homicide (2003). Its construction was featured in The Fugitive, Season 1, Episode 13, "Terror at High Point" (1963).Scarface (1983)

References

External links
https://web.archive.org/web/20110920103956/http://www.canyon-news.com/artman2/publish/DegreesCoolerfeb/Insiders_Look_at_Mt_Olympus.php
Mt. Olympus Property Owners Association

Hollywood Hills
Neighborhoods in Los Angeles
Populated places in the Santa Monica Mountains
Populated places established in 1969